belFEST was a festival celebrating and showcasing the music scene in Belfast, Northern Ireland. Established in 1996, it featured many bands and artists who have gone on to find fame and success in the record industry such as Snow Patrol, Duke Special, and Iain Archer. It ran through 2006.

It usually took place in the late Autumn, utilising the many venues of Belfast including The Limelight complex, the Empire Music Hall, Lavery's, the Duke of York, and the Black Box. The centrepiece showcases were free and were scheduled in such a way that the public could catch up to five or six bands per night by making their way back and forth to the various locations. The showcases were complemented by a range of high-profile gigs organised to coincide with the festival, as well as educational and fringe events featuring well-known and successful industry figures such as In the City, Factory Records, Hacienda boss Tony Wilson, and Creation Records founder Alan McGee.

belFEST was organised by local music promoter Gerry Sheppard, known to many as 'Shep the bollix'.

External links
belFEST 

Festivals in Belfast
Music festivals in Northern Ireland
Rock festivals in the United Kingdom
Rock festivals in Ireland
Pop music festivals in the United Kingdom
Music festivals established in 1996